Peculiarities of National Politics is a 2003 comedy film directed by Dmitry Meskhiev and Yuri Konopkin.

Plot
General Ivolgin is ready to go into big politics. High ratings of the unknown opponent confuse the competitors. They try to unravel the secret of the general's popularity and are taking steps to discredit him and even attempt to murder the general.

Cast
Alexey Buldakov – General Ivolgin
Viktor Bychkov – Huntsman Kuzmich
Sergei Gusinsky – Sergeant Semyonov
Semyon Strugachov – Lyova Soloveychik
Alexandr Tyutrumov – Kislyuk
Nina Usatova – Inna Usman
Sergei Russkin – Sergei Olegovich
Alexandr Polovtsev – Ilyusha
Viktor Sergeev – Viktor Sergeevich
Mikhail Porechenkov – Vanya
Yury Kuznetsov – Stepan Nikolaevich
Anna Kovalchuk – TV host
Konstantin Khabensky – Gosha
Andrei Zibrov – Venya
Mikhail Trukhin – Lyola

Production
Director of the previous films in the Peculiarities of National... series, Aleksandr Rogozhkin, wrote the screenplay for the picture, but declined to direct. Dmitry Meskhiev was then chosen as director, but because of financial reasons the production was stalled and later Yuri Konopkin finished the picture 

Most of the film was shot in Pskov

References

External links

Russian comedy films
Films directed by Dmitry Meskhiev
2003 comedy films
2003 films
Russian sequel films